Stephen Barton (born 17 September 1982) is a British composer who has lived and worked in Los Angeles since 2001. He has composed the music for dozens of major film, television and video game projects.

Early life
As a child, Barton became a cathedral chorister at the age of eight in the world-renowned Winchester Cathedral Choir, touring internationally with the choir in the United States, Australia and Europe, including concerts in Sydney Opera House, the Royal Albert Hall, and Carnegie Hall; and performing on numerous albums and television broadcasts. He subsequently won a prestigious Department for Education specialist music scholarship to study piano and composition at Wells Cathedral School, one of the oldest extant schools in the world. At 18, he moved to Los Angeles as assistant to the composer Harry Gregson-Williams, working for him on numerous film scores before branching out to form his own company in 2009.

Video games
In 2007, he wrote the score for the highly regarded Call of Duty 4: Modern Warfare (with Harry Gregson-Williams). He teamed up with the same developers at their new company Respawn Entertainment to work on the music for Titanfall, an online-only multiplayer shooter. Barton also created the music for the 2016 sequel, Titanfall 2. In 2019, he composed the original music for Titanfall’s battle royale sibling, Apex Legends, including the now iconic four note theme motif, and has continued to compose over three hours of music for all subsequent seasons of the game.

In 2019, he also co-composed the score for Star Wars Jedi: Fallen Order, which won the Society of Composers and Lyricists inaugural award for Best Original Game Score, as well as Music of the Year from G.A.N.G., amongst other awards.

Film and television
Barton's film work include scores for Unlocked, Cirque du Soleil: Worlds Away, Jennifer's Body, Tom Dolby and Tom Williams' debut feature Last Weekend, Line of Fire, Mrs. Palfrey at the Claremont and the BAFTA nominated thriller Exam. He also contributed music for the Narnia and Shrek franchises (including the "Fairy Godmother Song" from Shrek 2) as well as Ridley Scott's Kingdom of Heaven, Tony Scott's Man On Fire and Ben Affleck's Gone, Baby Gone.

In television, he scored two seasons of the highly regarded TV adaptation of 12 Monkeys, and has collaborated extensively on nature documentaries with Natural History New Zealand and the Discovery Channel.

Chris Prynoski, the animator behind the hallucination scene in Beavis and Butt-Head Do America, heard Barton's score for Call of Duty: Modern Warfare and asked him to score Titmouse's animated series G.I. Joe: Resolute, which led to a further collaboration on a series for Disney, Motorcity. In addition to those he also co-wrote the music for MTV's Disco Destroyer, a project conceived by Scott Mosier, Jim Mahfood and Joe Casey and animated by Titmouse, composing the score with Chevy Metal and My Ruin guitarist Mick Murphy. Subsequently, he scored Titmouse's Niko and the Sword of Light series for Amazon Studios.

Other work
Barton has collaborated frequently with Sir Anthony Hopkins since producing the soundtrack for the film Slipstream in 2006. He produced the Decca album "Composer", which topped the UK Classical charts for a month in 2012, as well as collaborating with Hopkins on the production of "And The Waltz Goes On" with André Rieu, which won the Classic FM "Album Of The Year" award in the Classic Brit Awards 2012. As a pianist he has performed extensively as a soloist with numerous orchestras including the Dallas Symphony Orchestra, Colorado Symphony, City of Birmingham Symphony Orchestra, and the Brussels Philharmonic, as well as on numerous movie soundtracks and diverse albums including Hybrid's I Choose Noise and playing the mellotron on a cover of Snowblind for Fireball Ministry's eponymously titled album in 2010.

He is recognized as a leading voice and expert in the emerging field of spatial and immersive audio, has consulted on the subject to the BBC and Qualcomm, is a committee member of the National Academy of Recording Arts and Sciences and a founder member of the Abbey Road Studios Spatial Audio Forum.

Discography
Film scores

Other credits

Television

Video Games

References

External links
Official website

1982 births
British film score composers
British male film score composers
English film score composers
English male film score composers
Living people
People educated at Wells Cathedral School
Video game composers